Alonso Miguel de Tovar, sometimes (less correctly) called Tobar (1678–1752) was a Spanish baroque painter, appointed court painter by Philip V in 1723.

Early career 

Alonso Miguel de Tovar was born in Higuera de la Sierra, near Aracena. in 1678, to a secondary and empoverished branch of the illustrious Tovar family, of the Lords of Tovar, later Marquesses of Berlanga. He trained in Seville under Juan Antonio Ossorio and Juan Antonio Fajardo, having executed numerous religious paintings, including Our Lady of Consolation with Saints Francis, James and a Clerical Donor (1720), in the Seville Cathedral, and St Francis Receiving the Stigmata (c. 1720), in the Royal Academy of San Fernando, Madrid. He was named pintor de cámara to King Felipe IV in April 1729, taking the place of Teodoro Ardemans. In both of these the influence of Murillo is discernible: the colouring is vivid and the drawing precise, if slightly rigid, and both works show what has been called a gentle and uncomplicated piety, differing to some extent from the tradition of Spanish religious painting.

He painted a canvas of Nuestra Señora del Consuelo in 1720 for a church in Seville. He returned to Madrid in 1734, where he died.

Career as court painter 

Tovar was appointed court painter in 1729, when the Spanish court moved to Seville, taking the place of Teodoro Ardemans. There he collaborated with Jean Ranc, probably painting replicas of the latter's portraits. His own portraits include Portrait of a Young Girl (1732), now in Meiningen, at Schloss Elisabethenburg. In 1733 he travelled with the court when it returned to Madrid, and he may have worked as an assistant to Louis-Michel van Loo. Tovar also probably painted the theme of the Holy Shepherd, popular with Sevillian artists of his time. Of the paintings of the subject attributed to him, however, only the one in the church at Cortelazor, near Aracena, signed in 1748, is considered authentic.

References

1678 births
1758 deaths
17th-century Spanish painters
Spanish male painters
18th-century Spanish painters
18th-century Spanish male artists
Spanish Baroque painters
Spanish bodegón painters
Court painters